San Mamés (also known as Nuevo San Mamés or San Mames Barria) is an all-seater football stadium in Rafael Moreno Pitxitxi Kalea, Bilbao, Basque Country, Spain. Inaugurated on 16 September 2013, the stadium replaced the "old" San Mamés as the home of Athletic Bilbao. With a capacity of 53,331 seats, San Mamés is the 7th-largest stadium in Spain and the largest in the Basque Country.

History

Planning and construction
The first stages of planning occurred as early as 2004, with initial contracts signed late on in 2006, after receiving approval to build in March 2006. The new stadium was to be built next to the existing San Mamés on land that was occupied until 2003 by the Bilbao International Trade Fair.

On 26 May 2010 at 12:00 the ground-breaking ceremony took place at San Mamés. The event was attended by: the Lehendakari of the Basque Country, Patxi López; the Deputy-General of Biscay, José Luis Bilbao; the Mayor of Bilbao, Iñaki Azkuna; the Chairman of Bilbao Bizkaia Kutxa, Mario Fernández; the President of the Royal Spanish Football Federation, Ángel María Villar and the President of Athletic Club, Fernando García Macua.

In a symbolic display, a piece of turf and a brick from the facade were removed from the old stadium and carried to the adjacent construction site by a human chain including famous players Iribar, Larrazábal, Iturraspe and Muniain as well as members of the youth system, the women's team, the reserve team and its oldest and youngest registered supporters.

Initially, three-quarters of the new stadium were built and then matches took place in it, while the old one was demolished to make room to complete the new arena.

Despite the economical woes the country was going through at the time, especially the Basque people, 52.6% of the total €211 million (£178 million) cost of the stadium was paid by public institution - some by the Basque Government (€50m), some by the Bilbao City Council (€11m) and some by the Biscay Provincial Council (€50m including land), as well as Athletic (€50m including land) and BBK/Kutxabank (€50m), on the proviso that the stadium would include facilities for use by the public such as a sports centre. It had been believed that the European Commission were investigating this use of public funds for any possible impropriety in the deal, but in late 2013 it was confirmed by Joaquín Almunia, the commissioner for competition at the time (and an Athletic supporter from Bilbao), that no such case was being pursued.

Initial opening

San Mamés was inaugurated on 16 September 2013, 102 days after the final game at the old stadium. At that time the official capacity of the partially completed arena was 35,686. The first match was a league match played at 22:00 between the hosts Athletic Club and Celta Vigo, which the local team won 3–2. A crowd of 33,000 was in attendance. The distinction of being the first ever goalscorer at the stadium went to Celta's Charles, while the first Athletic scorer was Mikel San José a few minutes later. Prior to the match, the captains of each of the club's age group teams, club captain Carlos Gurpegui and president Josu Urrutia took part in a short presentation accompanied by a traditional Aurresku dance.

The Celta match was Athletic's second home fixture of that season. As the new stadium was not quite ready, their opening game of the campaign (a 2–0 win over Osasuna) was played at Anoeta in Donostia-San Sebastián, home of rivals Real Sociedad.

Completion

The first match in the stadium under its full capacity was a Champions League playoff tie against Napoli on 27 August 2014, attended by 49,017. Athletic won 3–1 to progress to the group stage of the competition.

Roof extension

Since the stadium's opening, supporters had frequently voiced their displeasure at the roof, which did not protect all seats from Bilbao's frequently rainy conditions. Towards the end of the 2015–16 season, throughout the summer break and at the outset of 2016–17, extensions were added to the roof at a cost of €12.6 million, estimated to increase the effectiveness against wet weather by 70%. Finally, on 20 November 2016 the works were completed and the roof extension was fully functional in the 1–0 victory against Villarreal CF in a La Liga match. The lack of sunlight onto the pitch from the roof is offset by internal lighting modules which maintain the condition and growth of the turf, a system used in other Spanish stadiums.

Stadium features

The stadium is equipped with a sophisticated lighting system on its exterior which can be programmed to illuminate the hundreds of panels on its facade (which by day are white) in solid colours, or to show flashing or moving graphics (such as when a goal is scored, or the UEFA Champions League star-ball motif when Athletic qualified for that competition). It has similarities in this respect with the Allianz Arena in Munich.

It is also situated closer to the Nervión than its predecessor, overlooking the river from a high bank. Its elevated position presents a striking image of the stadium, particularly when illuminated.

Since 2015 the stadium has also featured a giant external video screen (15.5m X 9.8m), placed in a prominent position at the same point where the original San Mamés featured a large club crest. It looks onto the Pozas, a street running to the stadium from the heart of the city which is a popular walking route for fans on matchdays and is lined with Athletic-themed bars.

It is a club tradition for captains of teams visiting the Athletic ground for the first time pay homage to the fallen idol of its early years, Pichichi, by leaving a bouquet of flowers at a bust of the player. In the old stadium, this was situated near the directors' box. Despite concerns that this iconic feature might not be accommodated at the new stadium, a suitable spot was identified at the entrance to the players' tunnel, allowing the tradition to continue at the new location from 2013 onwards.

In August 2017, Athletic opened their new club museum at the stadium. The feature had been absent since the closure of the old stadium over four years earlier. Among the prominent features of the museum is a stuffed lion (the club nickname) 'won' from the president of Deportivo Alavés in 1984 after he lost a bet with the Athletic directors that the club would not be able to repeat their 1982–83 La Liga win the following season.

Special events and information

The new San Mamés was the venue for three friendly fixtures played by the unofficial Basque Country team between 2013 and 2016.

A 'beam back' event was held at the stadium in May 2015 for the 2015 Copa del Rey Final for fans who could not attend the game in Barcelona, with giant video screens installed on the pitch that the spectators could view from the stands.

On 5 November 2015, San Mamés was awarded as the Sports Building of the Year in the World Architecture Festival held in Singapore.

In 2017 there was a realistic possibility that the stadium could host the Copa del Rey final for the first time after Deportivo Alavés from nearby Vitoria-Gasteiz qualified for the showpiece game to face FC Barcelona. However, the stadium's controlling agency announced that it would not be feasible to accommodate the final on 27 May due to holding a Guns N' Roses concert on 30 May. The Copa final was subsequently assigned to the Vicente Calderón Stadium in Madrid, the 14th time that venue has hosted the final but significant due to it being one of the last matches prior to its replacement by the rebuilt Estadio Metropolitano.

The stadium hosted the 2018 finals of the European Rugby Challenge Cup and Champions Cup. The match between Leinster and Racing 92 set the stadium's single-game attendance record at 52,282.

The stadium hosted a MTV World Stage concert headlined by Berri Txarrak, Muse and Crystal Fighters on 3 November 2018, as part of the events related to the 2018 MTV Europe Music Awards being held in Bilbao.

On 30 January 2019, San Mamés hosted a Copa de la Reina match between Athletic Bilbao and Atlético Madrid that beat the Spanish attendance record for a women's football match with 48,121 spectators.

The neutralised start of stage 13 in the 2019 Vuelta a España included a lap of the pitch by the race director's car followed by the riders. Although a large crowd had gathered outside the stadium, the public were not allowed inside to view the event. Two cyclists (Edward Theuns and Pierre Latour) dismounted to mime taking a penalty. A similar event had preceded stage 5 of the 2017 Tour of the Basque Country.

UEFA Euro 2020
On 19 September 2014, San Mamés was selected as one of the 13 venues to host matches at UEFA Euro 2020. It was to host three group stage matches and one Round of 16 match in the tournament. Spain would have played all their group matches at the stadium, the first time the national team played in the Basque Country for more than 50 years (the old San Mamés hosted six games between 1921 and 1967 and a single fixture was played in San Sebastián in 1923). However, ultimately San Mamés was replaced by Estadio de La Cartuja in Seville due to the COVID-19 pandemic in Spain, with infection rates higher in the Basque Country than in Andalusia at the time of making final arrangements for the tournament in April 2021.

On 16 July 2021, the UEFA Executive Committee announced that due to the withdrawal of hosting rights for Euro 2020, San Mamés was given hosting rights for the 2024 UEFA Women's Champions League Final and the 2025 UEFA Europa League Final. This was part of a settlement agreement by UEFA to recognise the efforts and financial investment made to host UEFA Euro 2020.

Concerts

Access
The stadium is well served by public transport: it is located across the street from the city's Termibus regional bus station, and has a dedicated station - San Mamés (Metro Bilbao) which links the Bilbao tram, metro/underground and commuter rail networks. The major AP-8 road is also nearby. The stadium is also within a reasonable walking distance from most areas of the city centre, e.g. approximately 2 km from Casco Viejo (the old town).

References

External links 

Stadium profile at Athletic Club official website
 
San Mames Stadium IDOM website
New San Mamés Stadium Unofficial Site
Estadios de España 
Unofficial stadium guide

Athletic Bilbao
Football venues in the Basque Country (autonomous community)
Sports venues completed in 2013
Sport in Bilbao
Buildings and structures in Bilbao
Tourist attractions in Bilbao
Museums in Bilbao
2013 establishments in the Basque Country (autonomous community)
Estuary of Bilbao